Sushil Kumar Gupta is an Indian politician, businessman and owner of various schools in and around Delhi. He is a Member of Parliament in the Rajya Sabha of the Indian Parliament from the Aam Aadmi Party.

References

1961 births
Living people
Rajya Sabha members from Delhi
Rajya Sabha members from Aam Aadmi Party
Aam Aadmi Party politicians from Delhi
People named in the Pandora Papers